The Duchy of Courland and Semigallia was a duchy in the Baltic region, then known as Livonia, that existed from 1561 to 1569 as a nominally vassal state of the Grand Duchy of Lithuania and subsequently made part of the Crown of the Polish Kingdom from 1569 to 1726 and incorporated into the Polish–Lithuanian Commonwealth in 1726. On March 28, 1795, it was annexed by the Russian Empire in the Third Partition of Poland.

There was also a short-lived wartime state with the same name that existed from March 8 to September 22, 1918. Plans for it to become part of the United Baltic Duchy, subject to the German Empire, were thwarted by Germany's surrender of the Baltic region at the end of the First World War. The area became a part of Latvia at the end of World War I.

History

In 1561, during the Livonian Wars, the Livonian Confederation was dismantled and the Livonian Order, an order of German knights, was disbanded. On the basis of the Treaty of Vilnius, the southern part of Estonia and the northern part of Latvia were ceded to the Grand Duchy of Lithuania and formed into the Ducatus Ultradunensis . The part of Latvia between the west bank of the Daugava River and the Baltic Sea became the Duchy of Courland and Semigallia. It was ruled by the dukes from the House of Kettler with the exception of Ernst Johann Biron and his son Peter von Biron

Gotthard Kettler, the last Master of the Livonian Order, became the first duke of Courland.  Other members of the Order became the Couronian nobility, with the fiefdoms they had hitherto held becoming their estates.  In all, Kettler received nearly one-third of the land in the new duchy. Mitau (Jelgava) was designated as the new capital and a Diet was to meet there twice a year.

Several parts of the Courish area did not belong to the Duchy. The Order of Livonia had already loaned the Grobiņa district (on the coast of Baltic Sea) to the Duke of Prussia. Another district, the Bishopric of Piltene, also called the "Bishopric of Courland" (on the Venta River in western Courland), belonged to Magnus, son of the king of Denmark. He promised to transfer it to the Duchy of Courland after his death, but this plan failed and only later did Wilhelm Kettler regain this district.

Like the other members of the Order, Kettler was German and set about establishing the Duchy along the lines of similar German states.  In 1570, he issued the Privilegium Gotthardinum, which allowed the landholders to enserf the native peasantry on their lands.

When Gotthard Kettler died in 1587, his sons, Friedrich and Wilhelm, became the dukes of Courland. They divided the Duchy into two parts in 1596. Friedrich controlled the eastern part, Semigalia (Zemgale), with his residence in Mitau (Jelgava). Wilhelm owned the western part, Courland (Kurzeme), with his residence in Goldingen (Kuldīga). Wilhelm regained the Grobiņa district when he married the daughter of the Duke of Prussia. He also paid out and regained control over the Piltene district, but eventually, it fell to the Polish–Lithuanian Commonwealth. Here he developed metalworking and shipyards, and the new ships delivered the goods of Courland to other countries.

However, relations between the duke and the landowners were quite hostile. In addition, the Polish–Lithuanian Commonwealth, which was the overlord of the Duchy of Courland, supported the landowners. Wilhelm expressed his disappointment with the landowners, but this ended with his removal from the duke's seat in 1616. Finally, Wilhelm left Courland and spent the rest of his life abroad. Thus, Friedrich became the only duke of Courland after 1616.

From 1600 to 1629, the Polish–Lithuanian Commonwealth and Sweden conducted a war with its main battlefields around Riga. As a result, Sweden gained control of what is today central and northern Latvia, which became Swedish Livonia. The Commonwealth retained the eastern part of the Duchy of Livonia, thereafter called Inflanty Voivodeship in Polish. Courland was also involved in this war, but did not suffer severe damage.

Under the next duke, Jacob Kettler, the Duchy reached the peak of its prosperity. During his travels in Western Europe, Jacob became the eager proponent of mercantilist ideas. Metalworking and shipbuilding became much more developed, and powder mills began producing gunpowder. Trading relations developed not only with nearby countries but also with Britain, France, the Netherlands and Portugal. Jacob established the merchant fleet of the Duchy of Courland, with its main harbours in Ventspils and Libau.

Colonization

In 1651 the Duchy established its first colony in Africa, St. Andrews Island at the Gambia River, and founded Jacob Fort there. The main export goods included ivory, gold, furs and spices. Soon afterwards, in 1652, Courlanders established another colony, in Tobago in the West Indies. There the main export goods included sugar, tobacco, coffee and spices.

However, during this time, the Duchy of Courland remained an object of interest for both Sweden and the Polish–Lithuanian Commonwealth. In 1655 the Swedish army entered the territory of the Duchy, starting the Swedish–Polish war (1655–1660). The Swedish army captured Duke Jacob (1658–1660). During this period, the Dutch took over both of Courland's colonies that lacked supplies and manpower, and the merchant fleet and factories suffered destruction. This war ended with the peace Treaty of Oliwa (1660). Courland regained Tobago on the basis of the treaty and held it until 1689. Duke Jacob set about restoring the fleet and factories, but the Duchy of Courland never again reached its pre-war level of prosperity.

18th century
When Jacob died in 1682, his son, Friedrich Casimir, became the next duke. During his reign production continued to decrease. The duke himself was more interested in glamorous celebrations and spent more money than he had.  This forced him to sell Tobago to the British. During this period, the Commonwealth increased its influence in the political and economic life of the Duchy. Additionally, Russia showed an interest in this area.

Friedrich Casimir died in 1698. His successor, Friedrich Wilhelm Kettler, was only six years old and was under the regency of his uncle Ferdinand – a Polish general. During this time the Great Northern War (1700–1721) began between Sweden and Russia with its allies – the Commonwealth, Saxony and Denmark. As a result of the war, Russia took control of Swedish Livonia starting in 1710. In Courland, Russia also had such a strong influence that its ambassador, Pyotr Bestuzhev, became the most powerful man in the duchy. The Tsar of Russia, Peter the Great, received a promise from Friedrich Wilhelm that he would marry one of the daughters of the tsar's brother. By having this promise, Peter the Great wished to increase the influence of Russia in Courland. In 1710, Friedrich Wilhelm married Anna Ioannovna (later Empress of Russia), but on his way back from St Petersburg, he took ill and died. Anna ruled as the duchess of Courland from 1711 to 1730.

After the death of Friedrich Wilhelm, the next candidate for the seat of duke was Ferdinand Kettler, who, at the time, lived in Danzig. Because the law required the duke to reside within the Duchy, the Diet did not recognize him. Because Ferdinand was the last representative of Kettler's family, a remarkable number of candidates tried to gain the dukedom during this period. One favorite was Maurice de Saxe, natural son of Augustus II the Strong, King of Poland. Saxe had managed to gain support and was even mentioned as marrying Anna Ioannovna, Duchess of Courland at that time.
He was elected duke in 1726, but only managed to maintain himself by force of arms till the next year. Russia disliked him and sent an army to western Courland to destroy Maurice's base. When Catherine was Empress Peter Lacy was given responsibility for removing Maurice de Saxe from Courland.
As the result Maurice de Saxe had to leave Courland, and Russia increased its influence. This was achieved in good measure due to service of Peter Lacy who was governor of Livonia from 1727 until his death in 1751.  Russian influence increased further when Frederick August III, the Elector of Saxony, in his successful bid to succeed his father on the Polish throne in the 1730s, agreed to grant Anna of Russia her choice of successor to the Courish duchy in exchange for Russian support in the War of the Polish Succession.  (Because of the duchy's position as a vassal of the Commonwealth and Ferdinand Kettler's lack of issue, the duchy would otherwise formally have devolved onto the Polish throne.)  Anna appointed Ernst Johann von Biron duke of Courland in 1737.

Von Biron received remarkable financial support from Russia and invested it in construction – for example, the castle of Schloss Ruhenthal projected by the distinguished Italian architect Bartolomeo Rastrelli. Anna Ivanovna died in 1740, resulting in von Biron's exile to Siberia the following year. From there, through the Council of the Duke, he continued to control the Duchy, with the agreement of the king of Poland. However, the landowners of Courland disliked the agreement and even refused to follow the regulations of the Council of the Duke.

Duke Louis Ernest of Brunswick-Lüneburg was selected as Biron's successor on June 27, 1741, with the support of his cousin Maria Theresa of Austria, but while he was in St Petersburg to get this title ratified, Elizabeth of Russia carried out a coup on December 6, 1741, and he lost the title.

King Augustus III of Poland proclaimed his son, Carl Christian Joseph of Saxony, the next duke. Thus, the Duchy of Courland had two dukes simultaneously thereafter. The situation became extremely tense – one part of the landowners accepted von Biron, the other, Carl of Saxony. The Empress Catherine II of Russia (reigned 1762–1796) solved this situation by recalling Ernst von Biron from exile in 1763. By doing this, she avoided the possible increase of influence of the Commonwealth in Courland. However, political fighting had exhausted Ernst Biron, and he turned the seat of duke over to his son, Peter von Biron, in 1769. But political tumult continued in Courland. Some landowners supported the Commonwealth, some Russia. Ultimately, Russia determined the further fate of Courland when with its allies it began the third division of Poland (1795). Given a "nice recommendation" by Russia, Duke Peter von Biron gave up his rights to Russia in 1795. With the signing of the final document on March 28, 1795, the Duchy of Courland was incorporated into the Russian state and title of Duke of Courland was added to the title of Russian emperors.

Dukes of Courland and Semigallia

Gallery

See also
 Coat of arms of Courland
 Duchess of Courland 
 Courland
 Couronian colonisation
 Couronian colonisation of the Americas
 Ernst Friedrich von Ockel
 Livonia
 Semigallia

References

Bibliography
 Ceaser, Ray A., Duchy of Courland, University of Washington, June 2001.
 Plakans, Andrejs (1995) The Latvians: A Short History, Hoover Institution Press.

External links
 Courland
 Courland 1641-1795
 Flags of Courland
 Die Kurländische Ritterschaft
 Ritterschaften der Familie in Kurland

Royal residences in Latvia
 
1795 disestablishments in the Polish–Lithuanian Commonwealth
Historical regions in Latvia
1561 establishments in Europe
Fiefdoms of Poland